Ar Horqin Airport  is a general aviation airport being constructed to serve Ar Horqin Banner in Chifeng, Inner Mongolia, China.

The airport project was approved in 2015, and construction began in April 2016. A test flight was successfully conducted on 30 May 2018. The airport is rated class A1, capable of handling aircraft with up to 30 seats such as the Cessna 208B and the Harbin Y-12.

References 

Airports in Inner Mongolia
Chifeng